Troy Daniel Parrott (born 4 February 2002) is an Irish professional footballer who plays as a forward for EFL Championship club Preston North End, on loan from Premier League club Tottenham Hotspur and the Republic of Ireland national team.

Club career

Tottenham Hotspur
From Dublin, Parrott started his youth career with Belvedere. In July 2017, Parrott joined Tottenham Hotspur for an undisclosed fee. On 4 February 2019, on his 17th birthday, Parrott signed his first professional contract with Tottenham. He made his first-team debut for Tottenham in the 3–2 International Champions Cup friendly win over Juventus on 21 July 2019. On 24 September 2019, aged 17 years, seven months and 20 days old, Parrott made his professional debut for Tottenham in their third round loss in the EFL Cup against Colchester United. On 7 December 2019, aged 17 years, 10 months and three days old, Parrott made his Premier League debut under manager José Mourinho, in a 5–0 win against Burnley. On 8 February 2020, Parrott signed a new three-and-a-half year contract with Spurs until the summer of 2023.

Loan to Millwall
On 1 August 2020, Parrott joined Championship side Millwall on a season-long loan. After missing the start of the season due to suffering a quad injury during pre-season, he made his debut for Millwall in a 0–2 EFL Cup defeat to Burnley on 23 September, a match in which he also suffered an ankle injury which ruled him out of action for over 8 weeks. He made his first appearance following his return from injury in a 1–1 draw with Cardiff City on 21 November. Parrott made 14 appearances in all competitions for Millwall before being recalled from his loan in January.

Loan to Ipswich Town
On 1 February 2021, Parrott joined League One club Ipswich Town for the remainder of the season. making his debut five days later in a 2–0 victory over Blackpool. He scored his first senior goal in a 1–0 home win over Plymouth Argyle at Portman Road on 13 March 2021. Parrott made 18 appearances during his loan spell with Ipswich, scoring twice.

Loan to Milton Keynes Dons
On 29 July 2021, Parrott joined EFL League One club Milton Keynes Dons on loan for the 2021–22 season. He made his league debut for the club on 7 August 2021 in a 3–3 draw away to Bolton Wanderers. He scored his first goal the following week at home against Sunderland though MK Dons lost 2–1. On 8 March 2022, Parrott scored twice in a 3–1 home win over Cheltenham Town. He went on to make 47 appearances for MK Dons, scoring 10 goals and providing seven assists as the club secured a third-placed play-off finish.

Loan to Preston North End
On 25 July 2022, Tottenham Hotspur announced that Parrott had signed a new contract at the club until 2025 and was subsequently loaned out to Championship side Preston North End for the 2022–23 season. He scored his first goal for Preston in an EFL Cup win over Huddersfield Town on 9 August 2022. His first league goal for Preston North End was the winning goal in a 3–2 win over Norwich City at Carrow Road on 8 October 2022.

International career
Parrott has represented the Republic of Ireland at under-17, under-19 and under-21 youth levels. On 6 September 2019, Parrott scored on his under-21 debut in an Under-21 European 2021 qualifier against Armenia. He followed that by getting a brace of goals in the next fixture against Sweden. His third under 21 appearance was a 0–0 draw with Italy in which he was sent off after being shown a second yellow card following an altercation with Italy's Moise Kean, who received a straight red card for pushing Parrott in the face.

Parrott made his senior Republic of Ireland debut on 14 November 2019, starting in a 3–1 friendly win against New Zealand and providing an assist for Ireland's second goal of the game which was Sean Maguire's first international goal. On 24 August 2020, he was named in the squad to face Finland and Bulgaria in the Nations League games in 2020. He made his first competitive appearance for Ireland as a substitute in a 0–0 draw with Bulgaria on 18 November 2020. Parrott scored his first senior international goals on the 3 June 2021 when he scored two goals in a 4–1 win over Andorra in a friendly at the Estadi Nacional.

On 29 March 2022, he scored a 97th-minute winning goal in a 1–0 win over Lithuania in a friendly at the Aviva Stadium.

Personal life
Parrott was born in Dublin, Ireland. From 2013 to 2017, he attended O'Connell School in Dublin.

Career statistics

Club

International

Scores and results list the Republic of Ireland's goal tally first, score column indicates score after each Parrott goal.

Honours
Individual
FAI Under-15 International Player of the Year: 2017
FAI Under-16 International Player of the Year: 2018
FAI International Goal of the Year: 2019, 2021

References

External links
 Tottenham Hotspur profile
 Troy Parrott at fai.ie
 
 
 

2002 births
Living people
People educated at O'Connell School
Association footballers from Dublin (city)
Republic of Ireland association footballers
Republic of Ireland expatriate association footballers
Irish expatriate sportspeople in England
Expatriate footballers in England
Belvedere F.C. players
Tottenham Hotspur F.C. players
Millwall F.C. players
Ipswich Town F.C. players
Milton Keynes Dons F.C. players
Preston North End F.C. players
Premier League players
English Football League players
Republic of Ireland youth international footballers
Republic of Ireland under-21 international footballers
Republic of Ireland international footballers
Association football forwards